Finos Film (Greek: Φίνος Φιλμ) is a film production company that dominated the Greek film industry from 1943 to 1977. It was founded by Filopimin Finos in 1942 during World War II. It was the biggest film production company in Greece at the time and one of the biggest, in terms of productivity, in southeast Europe. After 34 years, Finos Films returned to the Greek film scene with the Greek-Italian co-production 'Urania' (2006). Additionally, the company re-releases its old movies on DVD completely remastered and in Dolby digital 2.0 sound on a monthly basis.

Films

This article is a partial list of films listed here:

Tickets - first place

1949-50:O methystakas - 304,438 tickets (1st of 7)
1952-53:The Taxi Driver - 190,589 tickets (1st of 22)
1956-57:To amaxaki - 138.620 tickets (1st of 30)
1956-57:I theia ap' to Chicago - 142,459 tickets (1st of 28)
1958-59:Astero - 139,501 tickets (1st of 45th)
1960-61:Alice in the Navy (Η Αλίκη στο ναυτικό, I Aliki sto naftiko) - 213,408 tickets (1st of 58)
1961-62:Downhill (Κατήφορος, Katiforos) - 161.331 tickets (1st of 68)
1969-70:The Teacher With Blonde Hair (Η δασκάλα με τα ξανθά μαλλιά, I daskala me ta xantha mallia) - 739.001 tickets (1st of 90)
1970-71:Ipolochagos Natassa 751.117 tickets (1st of 87)

External links
Finos Film

Greek brands
Film production companies of Greece